State Road 162 (FL 162) is an unsigned  state highway in Tallahassee, Leon County, Florida, that connects Florida State Road 61 and U.S. Route 319 south of Interstate 10 in northern Tallahassee.

Major intersections

References

External links
FDOT Map of Leon County (Including SR 162)

162
162
Transportation in Tallahassee, Florida
State highways in the United States shorter than one mile